Ein Vered is a moshav in central Israel. Located in the Sharon plain, it falls under the jurisdiction of Lev HaSharon Regional Council.

History

Before the 20th century the area formed part of the Forest of Sharon. It was an open woodland dominated by Mount Tabor Oak, which extended from Kfar Yona in the north to Ra'anana in the south. The local Arab inhabitants traditionally used the area for pasture, firewood and intermittent cultivation. The intensification of settlement and agriculture in the coastal plain during the 19th century led to deforestation and subsequent environmental degradation.

Ein Vered was established in the southern Sharon in 1930, by South African Jewry on land purchased by the Jewish National Fund, and named after 'Ayun el Werdat (Arabic for "the Springs of the Water Female Water Drawers"), the wells serving the area. It was originally an intensive farming community.  In 1947 it had a population of 450.

Citrus groves, field crops, beehives and flowers were the principal branches of agriculture.

Landmarks
The Israel Tractor Museum is located in Ein Vered.

References

Moshavim
Populated places established in 1930
Jewish villages in Mandatory Palestine
Populated places in Central District (Israel)
1930 establishments in Mandatory Palestine
South African-Jewish culture in Israel